César Sánchez (29 January 1935 – 26 November 2012) was a Bolivian footballer. He played in two matches for the Bolivia national football team in 1967. He was also part of Bolivia's squad for the 1967 South American Championship.

References

1935 births
2012 deaths
Bolivian footballers
Bolivia international footballers
Association football midfielders
C.D. Jorge Wilstermann players
Footballers from La Paz